Monica Chakwera  is the First Lady and wife to Dr.  Lazarus Chakwera, President of the Republic of Malawi. Born on 30 September 1958, she comes from Mwazisi village, T/A Chikulamayembe, in  Rumphi District, in the northern part of Malawi.

Early life and education 
Monica Chakwera was raised in the northern part of Malawi. She is an Accountant and a qualified Social Worker with a Bachelor of Arts in Social Work Degree from the University of the North, in South Africa.

Marriage to Lazarus Chakwera 
Monica Chakwera married Lazarus on October 8, 1977.  During their married life together, they have four children and grandchildren.

Charity 
Monica Chakwera founded the Shaping Our Future Foundation, an organization that is concerned with the development of the village girl.

References

External links
 

Living people
1958 births
First ladies and gentlemen of Malawi
University of Limpopo alumni